In hacking, a wargame (or war game) is a cyber-security challenge and mind sport in which the competitors must exploit or defend a vulnerability in a system or application, or gain or prevent access to a computer system.

A wargame usually involves a capture the flag logic, based on pentesting, semantic URL attacks, knowledge-based authentication, password cracking, reverse engineering of software (often JavaScript, C and assembly language), code injection, SQL injections, cross-site scripting, exploits, IP address spoofing, forensics, and other hacking techniques.

Wargames for preparedness 
Wargames are also used as a method of cyberwarfare preparedness. The NATO Cooperative Cyber Defence Centre of Excellence (CCDCOE) organizes an annual  event, Locking Shields, which is an international live-fire cyber exercise. The exercise challenges cyber security experts through real-time attacks in fictional scenarios and is used to develop skills in national IT defense strategies.

Additional applications 
Wargames can be used to teach the basics of web attacks and web security, giving participants a better understanding of how attackers exploit security vulnerabilities. Wargames are also used as a way to "stress test" an organization's response plan and serve as a drill to identify gaps in cyber disaster preparedness.

See also 
 Hackathon - computer programming marathon
 DEF CON -  largest  hacker convention
 Software Freedom Day - Linux and Open Source event
 Campus Party - massive LAN Party
 Cyberwarfare preparedness
 CTF

References

External links
 WeChall – list of wargame websites
 security.stackexchange.com - hacking competitions
 CTFtime - worldwide CTF tracking site

Hacking (computer security)
Computer security
Cyberwarfare